The 1916–17 season was the 43rd season of competitive football played by Rangers.

Overview
Rangers played a total of 41 competitive matches during the 1916–17 season. They finished third in the Scottish League after winning 24 of the 38 league matches and collecting a total of 53 points (11 behind league winners Celtic).

The Scottish Cup was not competed for this season, as the Scottish Football Association had withdrawn the tournament due to the outbreak of the First World War.

Results
All results are written with Rangers' score first.

Scottish League Division One

Appearances

See also
 1916–17 in Scottish football

References

Rangers F.C. seasons
Rangers